The 2013–14 Coupe de France was the 97th season of the most prestigious football cup competition of France. The competition was organized by the French Football Federation (FFF) and open to all clubs in French football, as well as clubs from the overseas departments and territories (Guadeloupe, French Guiana, Martinique, Mayotte, New Caledonia, French Polynesia, and Réunion). The winner, Guingamp, qualified for the group stage of the 2014–15 UEFA Europa League.

Holders Bordeaux were eliminated in the Round of 32 on penalties by fifth-tier Monticello.

Seventh round 

!colspan="3" align="center"|16 November

|}

|-
!colspan="3" align="center"|17 November

|-
!colspan="3" align="center"|23 November

|}

Eighth round 

!colspan="3" align="center"|7 December

|}

|-
!colspan="3" align="center"|8 December

|-
!colspan="3" align="center"|9 December

|}

Round of 64

Round of 32

Round of 16

Quarter-finals

Semi-finals

Final

Media coverage 
For the sixth consecutive and final season In France, France Télévisions were the free to air broadcasters while Eurosport were the subscription broadcasters.

These matches were broadcast live on French television:

External links 

 

2013–14 domestic association football cups
2013–14 in French football
2013-14